Freaked Out may refer to:

 Freaked Out, a 2004 novel by Alice Alfonsi in the Lizzie McGuire series
 Freaked Out, a 2006 novel in the Beacon Street Girls series
 Freaked Out, a 2013 comedy special by Tom Papa

See also
 Freak Out (disambiguation)